The 2023 Copa de la Liga Profesional (officially the Copa Binance 2023 for sponsorship reasons) will be the fourth edition of the Copa de la Liga Profesional, an Argentine domestic cup. It will begin on 20 August and will end on 17 December 2023.

The competition will be contested by 28 teams, twenty-six returning from the 2022 season as well as two promoted teams from the 2022 Primera Nacional (Belgrano and Instituto). Boca Juniors are the defending champions.

Format
For the group stage, the 28 teams were drawn into two groups of fourteen teams each, playing on a single round-robin basis. Additionally, each team will play one interzonal match against its rival team in the other zone. In each group, the top four teams will advance to the quarter-finals. The final stages (quarter-finals, semi-finals and final) will be played on a single-legged basis.

Draw
The draw for the group stage was held on 3 November 2022, 13:00, at AFA Futsal Stadium in Ezeiza. The 28 teams were drawn into two groups of fourteen containing one team from each of the interzonal matches. As the draw was held before the identity of the second promoted team was known, the interzonal rivals of Godoy Cruz and Barracas Central were called Alternativa 1 and Alternativa 2, respectively. They were:

Alternativa 1: a team between Gimnasia y Esgrima (M), Instituto and Sarmiento (J)
Alternativa 2: a team between Defensores de Belgrano, Estudiantes (BA) and Sarmiento (J)

Group stage
In the group stage, each group will be played on a single round-robin basis. Additionally, in the seventh round, each team will play one interzonal match against its rival team in the other zone. Teams will be ranked according to the following criteria: 1. Points (3 points for a win, 1 point for a draw, and 0 points for a loss); 2. Goal difference; 3. Goals scored; 4. Fair play ranking; 5. Draw.

The top four teams of each group will advance to the quarter-finals.

Zone A

Zone B

Results

Zone A

Zone B

Interzonal matches

Final stages
Starting from the quarter-finals, the teams will play a single-elimination tournament on a single-leg basis with the following rules:
 In the quarter-finals and the semi-finals the higher-seeded team will host the leg.
 If tied, a penalty shoot-out will be used to determine the winners.
 The Final will be played at a neutral venue.
 If tied, extra time will be played. If the score is still tied after extra time, a penalty shoot-out will be used to determine the champions.

Bracket

Quarter-finals

|}

Matches

Semi-finals

|}

Matches

Final

|}

Match

References

External links 
 LPF official site

A
2023 in Argentine football